Kostas Lagonidis (Greek: Κώστας Λαγωνίδης; born 1 July 1965) is a Greek former football player and current football manager.

Career
Lagonidis began his career at Xanthi in 1985. After 2 years, Lagonidis joined PAOK when he played 228 Alpha Ethniki games and scored 40 goals. In 1995, he transferred to Iraklis where he played two seasons. In 1997, he joined Apollon Kalamarias and he ended his career at PAOK in 1999.

References

1965 births
Living people
Greek footballers
Super League Greece players
PAOK FC players
Iraklis Thessaloniki F.C. players
Apollon Pontou FC players
Xanthi F.C. players
Greece international footballers
Association football midfielders
PAOK FC non-playing staff
Footballers from Kilkis